Oski may refer to:

 Oski the Bear, the official mascot of University of California, Berkeley
 Another name for Odin, the chief god of the Norse pantheon
 Nickname of Oscar Conti, Argentine cartoonist and humorist